National Testing Service - Pakistan (NTS) is a nonprofit organization in Pakistan that administers academic performance evaluation tests. It is similar to Educational Testing Service (ETS) in the United States. NTS is a member of the International Association for Educational Assessment. It is also recognized by the Higher Education Commission. 

NTS offers two main types of tests, the National Aptitude Test (NAT) and the Graduate Assessment Test (GAT). NAT is aimed at students seeking admission to colleges and universities, whereas GAT is aimed at graduates seeking admission to postgraduate education. NTS exams are also used to determine qualifications of students seeking advanced study abroad.

NTS was formed to ensure quality educational standards in Pakistan and to "provide a national scale for comparative grading between institutes", consolidating examination boards under one administrating body. According to Shahid Siddiqui, director of The Centre for Humanities and Social Sciences at the Lahore School of Economics, tests implemented prior to the development of the NTS were criticized as not accommodating socio-cultural differences, resulting in a need for "an indigenous testing service that should design and develop testing materials within an indigenous context". Prominent Pakistani institutions like COMSATS University (CU), Bahauddin Zakariya University (BZU), Balochistan University of Information Technology, Engineering and Management Sciences (BUITEMS), Center for Advanced Studies in Engineering (CASE) and the Islamia University of Bahawalpur (IUB) have made it compulsory for students seeking admission to have cleared tests conducted by NTS.

History
Controversy erupted in 2007 following the mandating of NTS testing, first announced by Muhammad Danish, Governor of Punjab, with regards to admission to universities and later set aside by the government unless the laws regarding university admission were amended. Criticism included allegations that the services were inconvenient to access and prohibitively expensive to economically challenged students. Maqbool called for input from the vice-chancellors of Punjab's public universities on 4 June. That year, each university department was permitted to set its own entrance requirements, with six of 64 departments at Punjab University electing to utilize tests from NTS. In October 2007, the vice-chancellor of Punjab University, Muhammad Arif Butt, endorsed the use of NTS testing in all departments of the university. NTS director Haroon Rasheed said that no tuition centres are associated with the service and NTS exams will not be out of course.

Legal education
In 2016 the Pakistan Bar Council amended the Legal Practitioners and Bar Councils Rules 1976 pertaining to admission of new advocates to the provincial Bar Councils. The new rules required applicants to sit and pass the Law Graduate Assessment Test (Law GAT) conducted by National Testing Service.

Criticism

NTS has sought to establish a national educational standard for Pakistan, but at the same time, as an organization, cannot and has not catered to the regionally diverse Pakistani nation. NTS resources are geographically restricted and both quantitatively and qualitatively limited. As stated by interface - an educational consultancy.  Its contention as an independent NGO can also be challenged as it is affiliated with numerous regular testing centers of COMSATS (as semi-government body or inter-governmental organization) and public/governmental education institutions for their entrance / admission exams.

A recent controversy of regular operational error has also arisen for PhD. assessment tests. The credibility/irresponsibility on the part of NTS officials has disqualified the candidates from applying in MPhil/PhD programs at public and private sector institutes because under HEC rules, they do not have any proof of clearing the test.

The overall process lacks credibility and transparency due to the un-disclosed nature of alternative processes for any participants, when they do not fall in the norms of the operating procedure (i.e. errors/loopholes) due to complexities that arise from multifarious of socioeconomic nature of challenges in  present-day environment of Pakistan.
Unfortunately, the NTS management have even been caught and identified as plagiarizing test questions and are indirectly controlled by Higher Education Commission of Pakistan (HEC).

References

External links
 

2006 establishments in Pakistan
Educational testing and assessment organizations
Standardised tests in Pakistan
Educational organisations based in Pakistan